Harold George Chaffee (June 6, 1926 – October 6, 2020) was an American college football player and coach. He served as the head football coach at Nebraska Wesleyan University in Lincoln, Nebraska, from 1969 to 1981, compiling a record of 55–61–2. As a player, Chaffee was a quarterback at Colorado State College of Agriculture and Mechanic Arts—now known as Colorado State University—in the late 1940s. Chaffee served in the United States Navy with the Seabees during World War II. He died in October 2020 at the age of 94.

References

1926 births
2020 deaths
Sportspeople from Littleton, Colorado
Military personnel from Colorado
Seabees
Coaches of American football from Colorado
Players of American football from Colorado
American football quarterbacks
Colorado State Rams football players
Nebraska Wesleyan Prairie Wolves football coaches
United States Navy personnel of World War II